There are two species of lizard named banded anole:

 Anolis stratulus, found in Puerto Rico, the United States Virgin Islands, and the British Virgin Islands
 Anolis fasciatus, found in Ecuador and Colombia

Reptile common names